Teale Orban is a former Canadian football quarterback for the University of Regina Rams.  He was selected in the sixth round of the 2008 CFL Draft by the Saskatchewan Roughriders.

Personal life
Teale Orban is the son of Rick Orban, a principal for the Regina School Board, and older brother of Taylor Orban, who played linebacker for the Rams.

References

External links
 Saskatchewan Roughriders bio
 University of Regina Athletics bio
 Balfour Collegiate bio

Saskatchewan Roughriders players
Regina Rams players
Players of Canadian football from Saskatchewan
Sportspeople from Regina, Saskatchewan
1986 births
Living people